CLJ may refer to:

 Commander of the medieval Military and Hospitaller Order of Saint Lazarus of Jerusalem (Malta)
 Commander of the modern Order of Saint Lazarus (statuted 1910)
 The IATA code for Cluj-Napoca International Airport, Romania
 The National Rail code for Clapham Junction railway station, London, England
 The code for Carlton railway station, Sydney, Australia
 Hewlett-Packard Color LaserJet printers
 The Constitutional Loya Jirga held in Afghanistan in 2003
 The Cambridge Law Journal
 The Current Law Journal (Malaysia) 
 The Clojure programming language
Caleb Landry Jones